Birds of Prey is a 1927 American silent drama film directed by William James Craft and starring Priscilla Dean, Hugh Allan and Gustav von Seyffertitz.

Premise 
Two pickpockets attempt to blackmail a banker over his former prison record. However, the female of the pair falls in love with the banker's son.

Cast
 Priscilla Dean as Helen Wayne 
 Hugh Allan as Hamilton Smith Jr 
 Gustav von Seyffertitz as Foxy 
 Ben Hendricks Jr. as Archie Crossley 
 Sidney Bracey as Gaston 
 William H. Tooker as J. Hamilton Smith 
 Fritz Becker as The runt

References

Bibliography
 Munden, Kenneth White. The American Film Institute Catalog of Motion Pictures Produced in the United States, Part 1. University of California Press, 1997.

External links

1927 films
1927 drama films
Silent American drama films
Films directed by William James Craft
American silent feature films
1920s English-language films
American black-and-white films
Columbia Pictures films
1920s American films